Ayersville may refer to:

 Ayersville, Georgia
 Ayersville, Ohio